Duetto (Hangul: 듀에토) is a South Korean duo formed by Starship Entertainment in Seoul, South Korea. They released a self-titled EP on May 17, 2017, Duetto and two singles, "Dream" and "Reminisce", in 2018. Baek In-tae and Yoo Seul-gi are classical tenors by training and studied together at Hanyang University under Baritone . Yoo Seul-gi led his class every year, both in college and masters program.

Baek and Yoo were lead members of InGiHyunSang, the 1st runner-up, in the South Korean crossover audition program, JTBC's Phantom Singer (season 1).

Members
Baek In-tae (백인태)
Yoo Seul-gi (유슬기)

Discography

Extended plays

Digital Singles

References

Starship Entertainment artists
South Korean musical duos
Musical groups from Seoul
Musical groups established in 2017
2017 establishments in South Korea